Madison Maree Wilson,  (born 31 May 1994) is an Australian competitive swimmer who has participated in backstroke and freestyle events at the Olympic Games and the FINA world championships. Wilson has been a member of three world record Australian relay teams, most recently at the 2022 Commonwealth Games.

Biography
Although born in the South West Queensland town of Roma, Wilson grew up in Yeppoon on the Capricorn Coast where she attended Sacred Heart Catholic Primary School and swam with local swimming club Yeppoon Sharks where she was selected in her first Queensland team.

Wilson won two medals as a member of Australian relay teams at the 2014 FINA World Swimming Championships (25 m) in Doha, Qatar: a silver in the women's 4×100-metre medley relay, and a bronze in the women's 4×200-metre freestyle relay.

At the 2015 World Aquatics Championships in Kazan, Russia, Wilson won three medals: a gold as a member of the winning Australian team in the women's 4×100-metre freestyle relay; a silver in the women's 100-metre backstroke; and a bronze in the women's 4×100-metre medley relay.

At the 2016 Summer Olympics, Wilson represented Australia in the 100 m backstroke, where she finished 8th in the final.  However, as a heat swimmer for the 4x100metre freestyle and medley relay teams, she received a gold and a silver medal after the teams placed first and second in their respective finals.

In recognition of her success at the 2016 Summer Olympics, Wilson was awarded a Medal of the Order of Australia in the 2017 Australia Day Honours.

Wilson again swam in the heats of the women's 4x100metre freestyle event at the 2020 Summer Olympics alongside Mollie O'Callaghan, Bronte Campbell and Meg Harris in July 2021, with the team posting the fastest qualifying time of 03:31:73. However, Wilson and O'Callaghan did not swim in the final with Emma McKeon and Cate Campbell selected to compete instead, taking the Australian relay team to victory. As heat swimmers, Wilson and O'Callaghan are still Olympic gold medal  recipients.

World records

Long course metres

 split 1:56.73 (2nd leg); with Ariarne Titmus (1st leg), Brianna Throssell (3rd leg), Emma McKeon (4th leg)
 split 52.25 (3rd leg); with Jack Cartwright (1st leg), Kyle Chalmers (2nd leg), Mollie O'Callaghan (4th leg)
 split 1:56.27 (1st leg); with Kiah Melverton (2nd leg), Mollie O'Callaghan (3rd leg), Ariarne Titmus (4th leg)

Short course metres

 split 51.28 (2nd leg); with Mollie O'Callaghan (1st leg), Meg Harris (3rd leg), Emma McKeon (4th leg)
 split 1:53.13 (1st leg), with Mollie O'Callaghan (2nd leg), Leah Neale (3rd leg), Lani Pallister (4th leg)
 split 23.32 (freestyle leg); with Mollie O'Callaghan (backstroke leg), Chelsea Hodges (breaststroke leg), Emma McKeon (butterfly leg)

Olympic records

Long course metres

 split 54.11 (1st leg); with Brittany Elmslie (2nd leg), Bronte Campbell (3rd leg), Cate Campbell (4th leg)

See also
List of Olympic medalists in swimming (women)
List of Youth Olympic Games gold medalists who won Olympic gold medals

References

External links 
 
 
 
 
 
 

1994 births
Living people
Australian female freestyle swimmers
Australian female backstroke swimmers
Swimmers at the 2010 Summer Youth Olympics
World Aquatics Championships medalists in swimming
Medalists at the FINA World Swimming Championships (25 m)
Swimmers at the 2016 Summer Olympics
Medalists at the 2016 Summer Olympics
Swimmers at the 2020 Summer Olympics
Medalists at the 2020 Summer Olympics
Olympic swimmers of Australia
Olympic gold medalists for Australia
Olympic silver medalists for Australia
Olympic bronze medalists for Australia
Olympic gold medalists in swimming
Olympic silver medalists in swimming
Olympic bronze medalists in swimming
Recipients of the Medal of the Order of Australia
Universiade medalists in swimming
Universiade gold medalists for Australia
Universiade bronze medalists for Australia
Youth Olympic gold medalists for Australia
Medalists at the 2013 Summer Universiade
World record setters in swimming
People from Roma, Queensland
Swimmers at the 2022 Commonwealth Games
Commonwealth Games medallists in swimming
Commonwealth Games gold medallists for Australia
Commonwealth Games bronze medallists for Australia
Sportswomen from Queensland
21st-century Australian women
Medallists at the 2022 Commonwealth Games